List of all the members of the Storting in the period 1922 to 1924. The list includes all those initially elected to the Storting as well as deputy representatives where available.

Rural constituencies

Østfold county

Akershus county

Hedmark county

Oppland county

Buskerud county

Vestfold county

Telemark county

Aust-Agder county

Vest-Agder county

Rogaland county

Hordaland county

Sogn and Fjordane county

Møre county

Sør-Trøndelag county

Nord-Trøndelag county

Nordland county

Troms county

Finmark county

Urban constituencies

Fredrikshald, Sarpsborg, Fredrikstad, Moss, Drøbak

Kristiania

Hamar, Kongsvinger, Lillehammer, Gjøvik (Market towns of Hedmark and Oppland counties)

Hønefoss, Drammen, Kongsberg

Holmestrand, Horten, Tønsberg, Sandefjord, Larvik

Notodden, Skien, Porsgrund, Brevik, Kragerø, Risør, Arendal, Grimstad

Kristiansand, Mandal, Flekkefjord, Stavanger, Haugesund

Bergen

Ålesund, Molde, Kristiansund

Trondhjem, Levanger

Bodø, Narvik, Tromsø, Hammerfest, Vardø, Vadsø

External links
Norwegian social science data service

 
Parliament of Norway, 1922-24